The Eagle Has Landed may refer to:

The Eagle Has Landed (novel), 1975 novel by Jack Higgins
The Eagle Has Landed (film), 1976 film based on the novel
The Eagle Has Landed (album), 1982 album by the band Saxon
The Eagle Has Landed, 1983 song by the band Saxon on Power & the Glory
The Eagle Has Landed – Part II, 1996 album by the band Saxon
The Eagle Has Landed – Part III, 2006 album by the band Saxon
"The Eagle Has Landed", 2016 song from Feathers & Flesh by the band Avatar
"The Eagle Has Landed", a song by the band Nirvana later released as "tourette's" on the album In Utero

See also
Apollo 11, for the quotation from the 1969 moon landing